Julio Baez was a Cuban baseball pitcher in the Negro leagues and Mexican League. He played with the New York Cubans in 1940. In 1946, he played for Alijadores de Tampico.

References

External links
 and Seamheads 

Year of birth missing
Year of death missing
Alijadores de Tampico players
New York Cubans players
Cuban baseball players
Baseball pitchers